Prospect Hill is a mountain located in the Catskill Mountains of New York north-northeast of Downsville. Conklin Hill is located southeast, and Brace Hill is located southwest of Prospect Hill.

References

Mountains of Delaware County, New York
Mountains of New York (state)